Danseur étoile (for men) or danseuse étoile (for women), literally "star dancer", is the highest rank a dancer can reach at the Paris Opera Ballet. It is equivalent to the title "Principal dancer" in Anglo-Saxon countries or to the title "Primo Ballerino" or "Prima Ballerina" in Italian.

The term étoile had been used to designate the best soloists of the Paris Opera Ballet since the 19th century, but it was only in 1940 that ballet master Serge Lifar decided to codify the title at the top of the company's hierarchy. Unlike all lower ranks in the Ballet (quadrille, coryphée, sujet, premier danseur), promotion to étoile does not depend on success in the annual competitive examinations. Dancers have to perform in leading roles, sometimes for many years, before they can be accorded the rank by the director of the Paris Opera, after nomination by the head of the ballet (directeur de la danse), in recognition of outstanding excellence and merit.

There is no specific rule regarding the nomination. Étoiles are usually chosen from among the premiers danseurs (the highest rank achievable through examinations), but exceptionally some dancers, such as Manuel Legris or Laurent Hilaire, have been promoted directly from the lower rank of sujet. The nominations were initially made in an administrative setting, then later backstage with the curtain closed. They now take place at the end of a performance, with the curtain open.

The title is conferred for life and is therefore kept after retirement, which is set at a maximum age of 42, like for all other dancers of the Paris Opera Ballet. The maximum number of active Danseurs étoiles within the company, originally limited to four, has progressively increased over time and is nowadays set at eighteen.

List of Paris Opera Ballet étoiles
By year of nomination (first date, second date corresponding to year of resignation or retirement):
 1940–1960 : Lycette Darsonval
 1940–1944 : Solange Schwarz–after the première of Entre deux rondes by Serge Lifar. The nomination occurred on stage (but with the curtain closed).
 1941–1946 : Serge Peretti first male "étoile"
 1941–1956 : Yvette Chauviré after the premiere of Istar by Serge Lifar
 1946–1959 : Michel Renault at age 19
 1946–1949 : Roger Fenonjois
 1947–1951 : Roger Ritz after the premiere of Palais de Cristal by George Balanchine
 1947–1957 : Christine Vaussard
 1947–1960 : Alexandre Kalioujny
 1948–1957 : Micheline Bardin
 1948–1963 : Max Bozzoni
 1949–1957 : Nina Vyroubova from outside the company
 1950–1959 : Liane Daydé at age 19
 1952–1960 : Madeleine Lafon
 1953–1953 : Jean Babilée nominated only 4 years after entering the Company, left 9 months later to found his own company.
 1953–1964 : Youly Algaroff
 1954–1967 : Jean-Pierre Andréani
 1955–1958 : Peter van Dijk from outside the Company
 1957–1961 : Marjorie Tallchief from outside the Company
 1956–1972 : Claude Bessy
 1957–1961 : George Skibine
 1958–1971 : Josette Amiel
 1961–1964 : Flemming Flindt
 1960–1977 : Claire Motte
 1961–1972 : Attilio Labis after a performance of Pas de Dieux by Gene Kelly, called for by André Malraux
 1961–1974 : Jacquline Rayet after a performance of Giselle
 1964–1986 : Cyril Atanassoff
 1964–1978 : Christine Vlassi
 1965–1983 : Nanon Thibon
 1966–1969 : Jean-Pierre Bonnefous
 1968–1983 : Noella Pontois
 1969–1989 : Georges Piletta
 1969–1983 : Wilfride Piollet
 1970–1980 : Claudette Scouarnec from the Opéra Comique dance troupe
 1971–1989 : Jean-Pierre Franchetti
 1971–1989 : Michael Denard
 1972–1989 : Patrice Bart
 1972–1983 : Ghislaine Thesmar
 1972–1990 : Jean Guizerix
 1974–1980 : Carolyn Carlson
 1976–1980 : Dominique Khalfouni
 1977–1998 : Charles Jude
 1977–1992 : Florence Clerc
 1978–1993 : Claude de Vulpian
 1980–1988 : Patrick Dupond
 1981–1996 : Jean-Yves Lormeaux
 1981–1999 : Élisabeth Platel
 1982–1996 : Monique Loudières
 1983–1997 : Françoise Legrée
 1984–1989 : Sylvie Guillem
 1985–2001 : Isabelle Guérin
 1985–2007 : Laurent Hilaire
 1986–2009 : Manuel Legris
 1988–2005 : Élisabeth Maurin
 1989–2008 : Kader Belarbi
 1990–1999 : Marie-Claude Pietragalla
 1993–2001 : Carole Arbo
 1993–2001 : Fanny Gaïda
 1993–2014 : Nicolas Le Riche
 1997–2013 : Agnès Letestu
 1997–2010 : José Martinez
 1998–2015 : Aurélie Dupont
 2000–2008 : Jean-Guillaume Bart
 2002–2012 : Clairemarie Osta
 2002–2017 : Laëtitia Pujol
 2004–2018 : Marie-Agnès Gillot
 2004–     : Mathieu Ganio
 2005–2008 : Wilfried Romoli
 2005–2011 : Delphine Moussin
 2005–2016 : Benjamin Pech
 2006–2018 : Hervé Moreau
 2007–     : Émilie Cozette
 2007–2017 : Jérémie Bélingard
 2007–     : Dorothée Gilbert
 2009–2014 : Isabelle Ciaravola
 2009–     : Mathias Heymann
 2009–2018 : Karl Paquette
 2010–     : Stéphane Bullion
 2012–2018 : Josua Hoffalt
 2012–     : Ludmila Pagliero
 2012–     : Myriam Ould-Braham
 2013–2021 : Eleonora Abbagnato
 2013–     : Alice Renavand
 2014–     : Amandine Albisson
 2015–     : Laura Hecquet
 2016–     : Germain Louvet
 2016–     : Léonore Baulac
 2017–     : Hugo Marchand
 2018–     : Valentine Colasante
 2020–     : Paul Marque
 2021–     : Sae Eun Park
 2022      : François Alu
 2023–     : Hannah O'Neill
 2023–     : Marc Moreau
 2023–     : Guillaume Diop

References